Edward Shore may refer to:

Edward Shore (footballer)
Edward W. Shore, ice hockey player

See also
Edward Shaw (disambiguation)